The Kardashians is an American reality television series which focuses on the personal lives of the Kardashian–Jenner family. The new show comes off the heels of their last show called Keeping Up with the Kardashians, which concluded in June 2021 after a 20-season run on E!.

The series focuses mainly on sisters Kourtney, Kim, and Khloé Kardashian and their half-sisters, Kendall and Kylie Jenner, and their mother, Kris Jenner. It also features some of their current and ex-partners, including Travis Scott, Travis Barker, Kanye West, Tristan Thompson, Scott Disick, and Corey Gamble, with guest appearances from various friends in the entertainment industry.

The Kardashians premiered on April 14, 2022, on the streaming service Hulu; its first season consisted of 10 episodes. Before the series debuted, it was greenlit by Hulu for a multi-season launch with a total of forty episodes. The second season also contained ten episodes, which premiered on September 22, 2022; a third season is in production.

Cast

Main
 Kris Jenner
 Kim Kardashian
 Kourtney Kardashian
 Khloé Kardashian
 Kendall Jenner
 Kylie Jenner

Recurring
 Travis Barker
 Scott Disick
 Tristan Thompson

Guest
 Kanye West

Episodes

Season 1 (2022)

Season 2 (2022)

Production 
On September 8, 2020, the Kardashian–Jenner family announced that their long-running reality television series, Keeping Up with the Kardashians, would be ending in 2021. The series had been on-air since 2007 and ran for 20 seasons on NBCUniversal's E! television channel. The program concluded on June 20, 2021.

In December 2020, during Disney's investors presentation event, it was announced that the Kardashian–Jenner sisters: Kim, Kourtney, and Khloé Kardashian, Kendall and Kylie Jenner  and their mother, Kris Jenner had signed a multi-year exclusive deal to create global content for Hulu. In October 2021, it was announced that an untitled Kardashian–Jenner Hulu series would be produced by the British production company, Fulwell 73. On January 1, 2022, the series title, The Kardashians, was announced by Hulu. According to Khloé, "to be still on cable was just not so on-brand for [the family]", explaining why the family decided to move to the streaming platform. The series is executive produced by Ben Winston, Danielle King, Emma Conway, and Elizabeth Jones for Fulwell 73, Kris Jenner, Kim Kardashian, Kourtney Kardashian, Khloé Kardashian, Kendall Jenner, and Kylie Jenner for Kardashian Jenner Productions, and Ryan Seacrest. King also serves as the series showrunner.

The first season premiered on April 14, 2022, and consisted of ten episodes. Post the season finale, which ended on a cliffhanger, media outlets started speculating a second season.

Prior to the series premiere, it was reported in March 2022 that Hulu had already renewed the series for a second season, as part of a multi-season order, with a total of forty episodes; the series was called a "premium" version of Keeping Up with the Kardashians. During the months of May and July 2022, the Kardashian sisters posted behind-the-scenes pictures from the series on their social media accounts, hinting at a second season. In June, on an episode of Deadlines Crew Call podcast, executive producer Danielle King confirmed that a second season was in production, revealing that Kourtney and Travis Barker's wedding was filmed. However, Kourtney later clarified that the season covers "everything leading up till [their wedding]". In July, Hulu announced that the second season would premiere in September 2022. It consisted of ten episodes.

Days ahead of the second season's premiere in September 2022, Kourtney revealed in an interview with E! News that a third season was in production.

Release 
The Kardashians premiered on April 14, 2022, on Hulu in the United States, and is released weekly on Thursdays. It premiered simultaneously internationally on Disney+ under the dedicated streaming hub Star, as an original series, Disney+ Hotstar, and on Star+ in Latin America. The first season consisted of ten episodes, with the season finale being released on June 16, 2022.

The second season premiered on September 22, 2022, following the same release schedule as the first season. The season premiere picked up where the season one finale ended.

Reception

Audience viewership 
According to Hulu, The Kardashians premiere was the most-watched series premiere for the streaming service in its first three days in the United States, and was the most-watched Star Originals series on Disney+ and Star+ across global markets. According to Whip Media's TV Time, The Kardashians was the 10th most streamed original series across all platforms in the United States, during the week ending November 6, 2022, and the 9th during the week ending November 13, 2022.

Critical response 
According to the review aggregation website Rotten Tomatoes, the series' first season has a 33% approval rating based on 15 critics' reviews, with an average rating of 5.80/10. The website's critics consensus reads: "While hardcore fans might enjoy catching up with The Kardashians, the lifestyles of this rich and famous family have lost their novelty." Metacritic assigned the series a weighted average score of 49 out of 100 based on 9 reviews, indicating "mixed or average reviews".

Accolades

References

External links 
 
 

2020s American reality television series
2022 American television series debuts
English-language television shows
Hulu original programming
Kendall Jenner
Kim Kardashian
Kylie Jenner
Television series about families
Television series about sisters
Television shows related to the Kardashian–Jenner family
Television shows set in Los Angeles